Bob Petersen may refer to:

Robert Petersen (disambiguation)
Bob Peterson (disambiguation)